Nikte is a 2009 Mexican animated adventure comedy film, produced by Soco Aguilar and Animex Producciones. It stars the voices of Sherlyn as the title character, Pierre Angelo, Pedro Armendáriz Jr, Alex Lora, Jorge Arvizu, and Regina Torné. It premiered in theaters on December 18, 2009.

Plot
The story starts with a girl and her family at La Venta park. The girl only thinks about herself, and her family goes with the tour guide while she stays at the entrance listening to her music. She leans on the Olmec head and discovers something in the Olmec head which she is transferred back to the times of Olmec.

Cast
Sherlyn as Nikté
Pierre Angelo as Chin
Pedro Armendáriz Jr as Kaas
Alex Lora as Chamán Chanek
Maya Zapata as Xtabay
Regina Orozco as Ij' Aesu
Jorge Arvizu as Guardián de Roca
Silverio Palacios as Jéfe Chaneke
Regina Torné as Diosa Luna / Meztli
Enrique Garay as Kike Garaytl

Production
Animex Producciones was in charge of coordinating the production which involved several animation studios in Mexico, including Grupo EsComic! and Estudio Haini.

Box office
This film was a box-office failure, due to an unsuccessful competition with James Cameron's Avatar.

Character name dispute and lawsuit
On October 10, 2009, Rolando Tamayo sued director Ricardo Arnaiz over the film's plagiarized characters called "Nikté", "Kan" and "Kin".

References

External links
 
 

Mexican animated films
Mexican children's films
2009 films
Indigenous cinema in Latin America
2000s Spanish-language films
Universal Pictures animated films
2000s American films
2000s Mexican films